Jaime Oliva Ramírez (born 19 November 1958) is a Mexican politician from the National Action Party. From 2009 to 2012 he served as Deputy of the LXI Legislature of the Mexican Congress representing Guanajuato.

References

1958 births
Living people
Politicians from Guanajuato
People from León, Guanajuato
National Action Party (Mexico) politicians
21st-century Mexican politicians
Deputies of the LXI Legislature of Mexico
Members of the Chamber of Deputies (Mexico) for Guanajuato